Drew Alan Springer Jr. (born October 27, 1966) is an American businessman and politician serving as a Republican member of the Texas Senate who represents District 30.

Education
Springer graduated from Weatherford High School in 1985. He then earned a Bachelor of Science degree in accounting from the University of North Texas.

Career 
A businessman, Springer is a former controller of a railcar company. He thereafter was a manager of three companies with a total of more than 1,000 employees. In 2005, he joined his father in business in the financial services industry.

Springer was first elected in 2012 when the incumbent Republican, Rick Hardcastle of Vernon, stepped down after fourteen years in office because of multiple sclerosis. Springer was appointed to the Agriculture and Livestock and the Land and Resource Management committees.

It initially appeared that Springer had lost the 2012 Republican primary election in a heavily rural district, when his chief opponent, Trent McKnight, finished with 49 percent of the vote. However, in the runoff election on July 31, with backing from two eliminated candidates in the primary, Springer topped McKnight, 8,434 (56.4 percent) to 6,521 (43.6 percent). Springer was unopposed in the 2012 general election in his heavily Republican district.

Springer noted that McKnight is a former Democrat who had never voted in a Republican primary election until his own race in 2012. The winner in eighteen of the twenty-two counties, McKnight blamed his loss on a high turnout in Cooke County, where there was also a competitive election for sheriff, and low participation in the counties in which McKnight led in the primary, despite the high-profile U.S. Senate primary between David Dewhurst and Ted Cruz. In addition to Cooke, Springer won in neighboring Montague as well as Garza and Floyd counties.

Springer represented the district 68th of the Texas House of Representatives from 2013 to 2021. The district, the second largest in the state in terms of square miles, includes a wide swath of twenty-two counties.

In 2013, Springer joined the large Republican majority in the Texas House in enacting H.B. 2 to restrict abortion. Springer co-sponsored the legislation. The legislation was subsequently struck down by the U.S. Supreme Court in Whole Woman's Health v. Hellerstedt.

Personal life 
He and his wife, Lydia, who married in 1991, have three children. They reside in Muenster, Texas.

References 

|-

1966 births
Living people
Republican Party members of the Texas House of Representatives
Republican Party Texas state senators
Businesspeople from Texas
People from Muenster, Texas
People from Weatherford, Texas
University of North Texas alumni
21st-century American politicians